Vadalvaat is an Indian Marathi-language television series which aired on Zee Marathi. It starred Aditi Sarangdhar in lead role.

Cast 
 Aditi Sarangdhar as Rama Chaudhari
 Arun Nalawade as Shrikrishna Chaudhari (Aaba)
 Meghana Vaidya as Sulakshana Chaudhari
 Neelam Shirke as Vishakha Chaudhari
 Ashish Kulkarni / Shekhar Phadake as Nikhil Saranjame
 Hemangi Kavi / Shubhada Patankar as Shravani Chaudhari
 Prasad Oak as Bhaskar Chaudhari
 Pooja Nayak as Janhavi Chaudhari
 Umesh Kamat as Soham Chaudhari
 Avinash Narkar as Satyajeet Chaudhari
 Anuradha Rajadhyaksha as Purva Chaudhari
 Lokesh Gupte as Samar Ajinkya
 Sharad Ponkshe as Devram Khandagale
 Pushkar Shrotri as Pratap Khandagale
 Sunil Godse as Shivram Khandagale
 Subodh Bhave as Jaysingh Rajput
 Sukanya Kulkarni as Vaijayanti Barve
 Chinmay Mandlekar as Samsher
 Kshitee Jog as Alandi Chhatre
 Shweta Shinde as Monika Sardesai
 Anand Abhyankar as Uddhav Gadre
 Vighnesh Joshi as Shree Kalyani
 Prajakta Hanamghar as Shriya Kalyani
 Abhijeet Chavan as Krushna Gunjal
 Akshay Pendse as Parth Vidwans
 Prabhakar Panashikar as Bhaiyya Chaudhari
 Rujuta Deshmukh as Saumya Raichand
 Vibhavari Pradhan as Samidha
 Santosh Juvekar as Shailesh Kavishwar
 Mitali Jagtap as Gayatri Kavishwar
 Pratima Kulkarni as Vasundhara Karkhanis
 Smita Oak as Lalita Kavishwar
 Maithili Jawkar as Champa Khandagale
 Mandar Chandwadkar as Sandesh Kothare
 Milind Shinde as Shrikant Vazalvar
 Mahesh Subhedar as Subhash Salvi
 Pankaj Vishnu as Ajay Nimbalkar
 Angad Mhaskar as Ujjwal
 Bharat Ganeshpure as Baban Ghodghate
 Astad Kale as Anand Kane
 Ajinkya Joshi as Ulhas
 Nilpari Khanwalkar as Neeta Joshi
 Mandar Devsthali as Vishwambar Pai
 Vinita Kale as Sanjyot Mujumdar
 Ketan Kshirsagar as Anand Rasal
 Rashmi Solanki as Shruti Jahagirdar
 Madhavi Soman as Nirmala Sadafule
 Chaitrali Gupte as Jaya Nikam
 Prashant Choudappa as Abhijeet
 Shubhangi Joshi as Jiji
 Uday Sabnis as Anna
 Anant Jog as Maharav
 Priya Bapat
 Kanchan Gupte
 Mugdha Shah
 Vilas Ujavane
 Vivek Joshi
 Rama Joshi as Dr. Asha

Awards

Airing history

References

External links 
 
 Vadalvaat at ZEE5
 

Marathi-language television shows
Zee Marathi original programming
2003 Indian television series debuts
2007 Indian television series endings